The Sonoma County Crushers were a minor league baseball team located in Rohnert Park, California.  They were a member of the independent Western Baseball League, and were not affiliated with any Major League Baseball team.

The team was one of the founding members of the league, beginning play in 1995.  They won their first and only league championship in 1998.  The team folded with the league after the 2002 season.  The Crushers were the only team in the WBL that remained in constant operation through the league's eight years. At one point, former San Francisco Giants outfielder Kevin Mitchell managed the Crushers.

The team played in Rohnert Park Stadium, which was built in 1981 for the California League's now-defunct Redwood Pioneers. The team mascot was Crusher, the Abominable Sonoman, with large purple feet for stomping grapes, in reference to the surrounding Wine Country region.

The team produced one notable professional baseball player in Chad Zerbe, who pitched for the San Francisco Giants from 2000–2003, including three appearances in the 2002 World Series against the Anaheim Angels. He was credited with a win in Game 5.

External links
Rohnert Park, California at Baseball Reference

Western Baseball League teams
Sports in Sonoma County, California
Baseball teams disestablished in 2002
Rohnert Park, California
Defunct baseball teams in California
Baseball teams established in 1995